Zach Kline is a Canadian football quarterback who is currently a free agent. He played at the University of California, Berkeley, Butte College, Indiana State University, returned to the University of California, Berkeley, and as a graduate transfer at Fresno State.

Kline was nationally ranked as the number 2 pro-style quarterback in the 2012 high school class. Kline committed to play for Jeff Tedford at the University of California, Berkeley, where he enrolled early at the start of 2012. Kline redshirted during the 2012 season, after which Jeff Tedford was fired. Kline lost the ensuing quarterback competition to Jared Goff under new Cal head coach Sonny Dykes. After Cal went 1–11 during the 2013 season, Kline elected to transfer.

Despite brief news of Kline transferring to Oregon State, an internal Pac-12 transfer blocked by Sonny Dykes, Kline enrolled in Oroville's Butte College for the 2014 season.

After the 2014 season at Butte College, Kline transferred to Div 1 FCS Indiana State University, where he was backup quarterback for the 2015 season; he appeared in 3 games. Following the 2015 season, Kline returned to the University of California Berkeley in pursuit of his degree. Following the departure of offensive coordinator Tony Franklin, Kline rejoined the Cal Football Team for 2016 spring practices.

During the 2016 Cal Spring Game, Kline was 15–16 for 202 yards with 2 touchdowns. However, Cal took graduate transfer Davis Webb as their starter for the 2016 season. Kline graduated with a degree in English in summer 2016, and transferred to Fresno State University where he played for Tim DeRuyter before his firing.

References

External links
 Fresno State Bulldogs bio

Living people
1993 births
American football quarterbacks
Canadian football quarterbacks
American players of Canadian football
California Golden Bears football players
Butte Roadrunners football players
Indiana State Sycamores football players
Fresno State Bulldogs football players
Edmonton Elks players
Players of American football from California
Sportspeople from the San Francisco Bay Area
People from Danville, California